Etele Baláska (born 8 October 2002) is a Romanian professional footballer who plays as a midfielder for Liga I side Sepsi OSK Sfântu Gheorghe.

References

External links
 
 Etele Baláska at lpf.ro

2002 births
Living people
People from Târgu Secuiesc
Romanian footballers
Association football midfielders
Liga I players
Sepsi OSK Sfântu Gheorghe players